"Better with the Lights Off" is a song written and recorded by American hip hop duo New Boyz and features vocals from R&B singer Chris Brown, taken from New Boyz' second studio album, Too Cool To Care. The song was released as a promotional single on May 3, 2011 via digital download in the United States and was released as the third single from the album on August 2, 2011.

Critical response
Allmusic highlighted the song and wrote a positive opinion: "when “girl you look better with” ends up the big hook behind the Chris Brown feature “Better with the Lights Off,” it’s hard to think of a grander moment that the entire snotty-males-in-their-early-twenties movement has yet offered."

Chart performance
The single debuted at number 61 on the Billboard Hot 100 as a promotional single. After being officially released, it re-entered the chart at number 75 and reached a peak of number 38.

Music video
The official music video premiered on MTV on June 15, 2011. It was directed by Colin Tilley.

Charts

Year-end charts

Certifications

References

2011 singles
2011 songs
New Boyz songs
Chris Brown songs
Asylum Records singles
Song recordings produced by the Cataracs
Music videos directed by Colin Tilley
Songs written by Chris Brown
Songs written by Kshmr